Journey of a Red Fridge is a 2007 documentary film about 17-year-old porter Hari Rai working in the Himalayan Mountains of Nepal. It was directed by Natasa Urban and Lucian Muntean (aka Lunam Docs), a Serbian independent documentary production duo specializing in telling the stories of working children. Journey of a Red Fridge was produced in association with The Global Fund for Children.

Synopsis
Journey of a Red Fridge is a story of a 17-year-old boy named Hari Rai, who lives in a small village in the Himalayan Mountains of Nepal, and his extraordinary journey. Hari is a student. However, he also works as a porter so that he could pay for his tuition and cover his living expenses. Although very young, he already has three years of experience carrying loads up and down the mountain, mostly tourists' backpacks. This time, he gets a job to carry a huge red refrigerator from the top of the mountain, to the nearest town.

We follow Hari Rai on his journey through the fascinating Himalayan landscapes, we discover Hari’s inner life, his thoughts, hopes and dreams and we also get to know the culture and the local people’s way of life in this region. We learn about their relation with the most important aspects of their lives: family, nature and religion.

Out of 60,000 child porters in Nepal, Hari is one of the few lucky ones to have a chance of going to school. Journey of a Red Fridge shows us what it takes for him to get his education.

Alternate titles
Die Reise des roten Kühlschranks (Austria TV title; ORF)
Die Reise des roten Kühlschranks (Germany TV title; ARTE)
Les tribulations d'un frigo rouge (France TV title; ARTE)
Punainen jääkaappi (Finland TV title; YLE)
Putovanje crvenog frižidera (Serbia TV title)

Exhibition and awards
Journey of a Red Fridge premiered at the 2007 IDFA Film Festival, Amsterdam, the Netherlands. Since then, Journey of a Red Fridge has been screened at more than 80 international festivals and received 24 awards.

Journey of a Red Fridge was released on DVD in March 2009.

References

External links
 
 
 Journey of a Red Fridge on ARTE
 Journey of a Red Fridge on YLE
 

Video
Journey of a Red Fridge – 3-minute excerpt on Digital Himalaya

2007 films
Serbian documentary films
2007 documentary films
2000s Nepali-language films
Nepalese documentary films